Frederik Klaas Jan "Erik" Hartsuiker (19 October 1940 - 13 January 2019) was a Dutch rower who competed at the 1964 and 1968 Summer Olympics. In 1964, he won a bronze medal in the coxed pairs event, together with Herman Rouwé and Jan-Just Bos. Four years later, he finished ninth in the coxed fours competition.

References

1940 births
2019 deaths
People from Avereest
Dutch male rowers
Olympic rowers of the Netherlands
Rowers at the 1964 Summer Olympics
Rowers at the 1968 Summer Olympics
Olympic bronze medalists for the Netherlands
Olympic medalists in rowing
Medalists at the 1964 Summer Olympics
Sportspeople from Overijssel
20th-century Dutch people
21st-century Dutch people